Blacks and Whites GAA is a Gaelic Athletic Association club located in Skeoughvosteen, County Kilkenny, Ireland. The club was founded in 1927 and fields teams in both Gaelic football and hurling.

Achievements
 All-Ireland Junior Club Hurling Championship Runners-Up 2003
 Leinster Junior Club Hurling Championship Winners 2002, 2009
 Kilkenny Junior Hurling Championship Winners 1998, 2002, 2009, 2022; Runners-Up 1992, 1994 
 Kilkenny Senior Club Football Championship Winners 1932

Notable players
 Thomas Walsh
 Peter Cleere

External links
 Blacks and Whites GAA website

Gaelic games clubs in County Kilkenny
Hurling clubs in County Kilkenny
Gaelic football clubs in County Kilkenny